The Box is a Swedish supernatural psychological thriller television series created by Adi Hasak for the Nordic Entertainment Group and first released on 28 November 2021 on Viaplay.

Premise
Detective Sharon Pici appears to have mental issues. However, unknown to those around her, her actions are driven by supernatural forces.

Cast and characters

Main
 Anna Friel as Sharon Pici: a Kansas City detective, titular "queen of the box".
 Peter Stormare as Jedidiah Brag: a police lieutenant and Pici's boss.
 Alexander Karim as Thomas Lovell: a detective, Pici's partner. 
 Helen Behan as Tory Snow: a police department psychologist who is treating Pici.
 Olivia Grant as Sylvian Rosen: a prosecutor and also Pici's wife.
 Shaq B. Grant as Joseph Anderson: a police officer.
 Letitia Hector as Jenny Block: a trainee detective.

Recurring
 Nina Yndis as Adina Ilic: suspected of murdering her husband.
 Gerard Monaco as Joey Cox: another suspect.
 Julia Szczygiel as Charlene:
 Bjarne Graflund as an Off Duty Cop:
 Fredrik Malm as an Off Duty Cop:
 Dennis Duolee as Teddy Lewis:
 Nina Yndis as Zoe Popescu: Adina Ilic's sister.
 Silas Strand as Jonah: Pici and Rosen's son.
 John Guerrasio as Hiram Saperstein:
 Rennie Mirro as Fake Hiram Saperstein:
 Rasmus Wurm as The Magician:

Episodes

Background and production
The Box is an English language series created and written by Adi Hasak. An announcement about The Box was made at the 2020 MIPCOM, with production due to start in Sweden in February 2021. It was developed by the Nordic Entertainment Group who gave a straight to series order to be produced by Nice Drama, an NENT Studios company, that is now part of Viaplay Studios. Production was also undertaken by Adi TV Studios. Production started in March 2021.

Release
The Box was released on the Viaplay streaming service in Poland, the Baltics and Nordic countries on 28 November 2021. It will be available in the Netherlands and the UK in 2022 when Viaplay is launched in those countries. For all other countries MGM has global distribution rights.

Reception

References

External links

2021 Swedish television series debuts
English-language television shows
2020s supernatural television series
Psychological thriller television series
Television shows set in Kansas